Jens Niclas Alexandersson (born 29 December 1971) is a Swedish former professional footballer who played as a right winger and right back.

Beginning his career with Halmstads BK in 1989, he went on to represent IFK Göteborg, Sheffield Wednesday, Everton, and West Ham United before retiring in 2009.

A full international between 1993 and 2008, he won 109 caps for the Sweden national team and represented his country at two FIFA World Cups (2002 and 2006) and two UEFA European Championships (2000 and 2008).

Club career
After starting his career with local club Vessigebro BK he moved to Halmstads BK in 1988. He played for the team until 1995, when he joined IFK Göteborg, with whom he won Allsvenskan in 1996 and played in the UEFA Champions League. After one year in Gothenburg, he moved on to England, where he was signed for £750,000 by Ron Atkinson for Sheffield Wednesday. He played for three seasons in Sheffield, where he became a fans favourite and won the Player of The Season award the year the team was relegated from the Premier League. After relegation he was signed by Everton for £2.5 million where he played for from 2000 to 2003, until he moved back to Gothenburg, where he played from 2004 to 2008.

After an initial retirement in 2008 Alexandersson worked at IFK Göteborg's youth academy, Änglagårdskolan. On 27 September 2009, newspapers reported that he was to make a comeback and would start training again on 29 September 2009. On 2 October 2009 it was revealed that Alexandersson has sign a contract for the rest of the season. After the season, he retired for good.

In 2017, Alexandersson made a brief comeback when appearing in a Division 3 Sydvästra Götaland game for Västra Frölunda IF against Kungsbacka IF, appearing as a substitute in the 78th minute and playing alongside his son Noah Alexandersson in a 6–0 win.

International career
He made his debut for the Sweden national team in 1993, and participated in 109 international games, scoring seven goals. His participation in the national team includes the 2002 FIFA World Cup, 2006 FIFA World Cup, Euro 2000 and Euro 2008. He was also a member of the Swedish squad that competed at the 1992 Summer Olympics in Barcelona. One of his goals came in Sweden's 1–1 draw against England, which he shot powerfully from outside the box and passed through David Seaman during the group stages of the 2002 World Cup.

The day after Sweden's exit from Euro 2008 he decided that he would retire from the national team alongside Marcus Allbäck, however he also said that if it was needed, due to injuries, he would play for the national team again.

Personal life
Alexandersson was born in Halmstad on 29 December 1971 to father Lennart Alexandersson, a former Halmstads BK player. He grew up in Falkenberg, where he started playing football in the local club Vessigebro BK. In 1978, his brother Daniel Alexandersson, who was also a professional football player, was born. In 1988, he moved to Halmstad to play for Halmstads BK. He attended Falkenbergsgymnasieskola 1987-1990.

Alexandersson married his wife Frida. The couple had first child Tilda in 1999 and son named Noah in 2001. While playing football, Alexandersson's family has lived in numerous places including Sheffield, Liverpool, Warrington, and London before returning to Gothenborg. His son Noah Alexandersson has gone on to play professional football for IFK Göteborg in Allsvenskan.

Career statistics

International 
Appearances and goals by national team and year

International goals

Honours 
IFK Göteborg

 Allsvenskan: 1996, 2007
 Svenska Cupen: 2008
 Svenska Supercupen: 2008
Individual
 Swedish Midfielder of the Year: 1995
 Sheffield Wednesday F.C. Player of the Year: 1999–2000

See also
 List of men's footballers with 100 or more international caps

References

External links

1971 births
Living people
Sportspeople from Halmstad
Swedish footballers
Association football midfielders
Sweden international footballers
Sweden youth international footballers
Olympic footballers of Sweden
Footballers at the 1992 Summer Olympics
UEFA Euro 2000 players
2002 FIFA World Cup players
2006 FIFA World Cup players
UEFA Euro 2008 players
FIFA Century Club
Allsvenskan players
Premier League players
English Football League players
Halmstads BK players
IFK Göteborg players
Sheffield Wednesday F.C. players
Everton F.C. players
West Ham United F.C. players
Swedish expatriate footballers
Swedish expatriate sportspeople in England
Expatriate footballers in England
Sportspeople from Halland County